Bina Devi Budhathoki Magar is a Nepali politician and a member of the House of Representatives of the federal parliament of Nepal. She was elected to parliament under the proportional representation system from CPN (Unified Socialist). She is also a member of the Public Account Committee of the parliament.

References

Living people
Communist Party of Nepal (Unified Socialist) politicians
Place of birth missing (living people)
Nepal MPs 2017–2022
Communist Party of Nepal (Unified Marxist–Leninist) politicians
1970 births